Margaret Douglas, Countess of Lennox (8 October 1515 – 7 March 1578), was the daughter of the Scottish queen dowager Margaret Tudor and her second husband Archibald Douglas, 6th Earl of Angus and thus the grand-daughter of Henry VII of England.  She was the grand-mother of James VI and I.

In her youth she was high in the favour of her uncle, Henry VIII of England, but later incurred his anger for her unauthorised engagement to Lord Thomas Howard, who died in the Tower of London in 1537. In 1544, she married Matthew Stewart, 4th Earl of Lennox. Her son Henry Stuart, Lord Darnley, married Mary, Queen of Scots, and was the father of James VI and I.

Early life
Margaret was born at Harbottle Castle in Northumberland on 8 October 1515. Her mother had crossed the border from Scotland when her father was facing difficulties in Scotland. In October 1528, Angus was threatened by James V of Scotland and sent Margaret back over the River Tweed into England at Norham Castle. After a brief stay at Berwick Castle accompanied by her nurse or 'gentlewoman' Isobel Hoppar, Margaret joined the household of her godfather, Cardinal Wolsey. When Wolsey died in 1530, Lady Margaret was invited to the royal Palace of Beaulieu, where she resided in the household of Princess Mary. Because of her nearness to the English crown, Lady Margaret Douglas was brought up chiefly at the English court in close association with Mary, her first cousin, the future Queen Mary I, who remained her lifelong friend; even when her father fled to England in May 1529 and remained there until 1542, Margaret never entered her father's custody, remaining in royal custody instead. Margaret gave Princess Mary gifts on New Year's Day, in 1543 her gift was a satin gown of carnation silk in Venice fashion. At Christmastime at Greenwich Palace in 1530, 1531, and 1532, Henry VIII gave Margaret the generous sum of 10 marks (£6-13s–4d).

When Anne Boleyn's court was established, Margaret was appointed as a lady-in-waiting. There she met Anne Boleyn's uncle, Lord Thomas Howard (not to be confused with his brother Thomas Howard, 3rd Duke of Norfolk), and they began their courtship. Thomas was a younger son of Thomas Howard, 2nd Duke of Norfolk, by his second marriage to Agnes Tilney. By the end of 1535 Thomas and Margaret had fallen in love and become secretly engaged.

King Henry turned against Anne Boleyn in May 1536. When in early July 1536 he learned of Margaret's engagement to Thomas Howard (Anne's uncle), he was furious. Henry had declared his daughters Mary and Elizabeth bastards, leaving Margaret very high in the line of succession; for her to contract an unauthorised marriage was politically outrageous, especially with the son of a powerful nobleman and near kin of the disgraced queen. Both Lord Thomas and Lady Margaret were committed to the Tower. On 18 July 1536, Parliament, by an Act of Attainder, condemned Thomas to death for attempting to 'interrupt ympedyte and lett the seid Succession of the Crowne'. The Act also forbade the marriage of any member of the King's family without his permission. Thomas was spared execution, but remained in the Tower even after Margaret broke off their relationship. He died there on 31 October 1537.

Margaret also fell ill in the Tower, and the King allowed her to move to Syon Abbey under the supervision of the abbess. She was released from imprisonment on 29 October 1537. According to G. J. Meyer in his work The Tudors, King Henry VIII had interpreted the marriage between Lord Thomas Howard and Margaret Douglas to be an attempt by Lord Howard to "make himself the King of England." However, the many love letters between Margaret Douglas and Lord Thomas reveal a true love affair wrongfully ended by the paranoia of King Henry VIII.

In 1539, Margaret and the Duchess of Richmond were appointed to greet Henry VIII's bride, Anne of Cleves, at Greenwich Palace, join her household, and convey her to the King. This would have been a great honour, but instead Henry chose to meet Anne at Rochester.

In 1540, Margaret was again in disgrace with the King when she had an affair with Lord Thomas Howard's half-nephew Sir Charles Howard. He was the son of Thomas' elder half-brother Lord Edmund Howard, and a brother of Henry VIII's fifth wife, Catherine Howard.

In 1543, Margaret was one of the few witnesses of King Henry's final marriage to Catherine Parr, Dowager Lady Latimer, at Hampton Court. Margaret became one of Queen Catherine's chief ladies. Catherine Parr and Margaret had known each other since they both had come to court in the 1520s.

Marriage and diplomacy

In 1544, Lady Margaret married a Scottish exile, Matthew Stewart, 4th Earl of Lennox (1516–1571), who later became regent of Scotland in 1570–1571. In total the couple had eight or nine children, four boys: Henry, Henry, Philip and Charles, and four unnamed daughters, though only two sons—Henry Stuart (1546–1567), born in 1546 at Temple Newsam; and Charles Stuart (1555–1576), who later married Elizabeth Cavendish in 1574—survived to manhood; one of their other siblings was called Philip, presumably after the Spanish king and husband of Margaret's cousin, Mary I. Elizabeth Cavendish, wife of Charles, Earl of Lennox, was the daughter of Sir William Cavendish and Bess of Hardwick.

In June 1548, during the war of the Rough Wooing, Margaret's father, the Earl of Angus, wrote to her with the news that her uncle, George Douglas, and others of the family had been captured at Dalkeith Palace. Her father hoped that she and her husband could arrange that they were well treated as prisoners. The Earl of Lennox forwarded the letter to the Duke of Somerset, writing that his father-in-law would have done better to ask others for help. Margaret wrote to her father from Wressle Castle in March 1549, complaining that he had avoided meeting her husband. She asked him to seek an honourable peace through the acknowledgement of her marriage, "what a memorial it should be to you!"

During the reign of Queen Mary I of England, Lady Margaret had rooms in Westminster Palace. In November 1553, the Queen told the ambassador, Simon Renard, that Margaret was best suited to succeed her to the throne. Margaret was the chief mourner at Queen Mary's funeral in December 1558. On the accession of Queen Elizabeth I of England, Margaret moved to Yorkshire, where her home at Temple Newsam became a centre for Roman Catholic intrigue.

Margaret succeeded in marrying her elder son, Lord Darnley, to his first cousin, Mary, Queen of Scots, thus uniting their claims to the English throne. Queen Elizabeth I disapproved of this marriage and had Lady Margaret sent to the Tower of London in 1566, but after the murder of Margaret's son Darnley in 1567, she was released. Margaret denounced her daughter-in-law, but was eventually later reconciled with her. Her husband assumed the government of Scotland as regent, but was assassinated in 1571.

On 3 August, the governor of Scotland, Regent Morton wrote to her about the capture of Edinburgh Castle from the supporters of Mary, Queen of Scots. An English commander at the siege, William Drury, had obtained some of the jewels of Mary, Queen of Scots. Morton thought that Margaret was best placed to ask and influence Drury to send the jewels back to him in Scotland.

In 1574, she again aroused Queen Elizabeth's anger by marrying her younger son Charles to Elizabeth Cavendish, the stepdaughter of the Earl of Shrewsbury. She was again sent to the Tower, unlike the Countess of Shrewsbury, but was pardoned after her son Charles' death in 1576.

Lady Margaret's diplomacy largely contributed to the future succession of her grandson, James VI of Scotland, to the English throne.

Death and legacy

After the death of her younger son, she helped care for his daughter, Lady Arbella. However, she did not outlive him by very long. A few days before her death, she dined with Robert Dudley, Earl of Leicester, and this led to rumours that she had been poisoned. There is no historical evidence to substantiate this.

Although she died in debt, she was given a grand funeral in Westminster Abbey, at the expense of Queen Elizabeth I, with a hundred poor women in attendance. She was buried in the same grave as her son Charles in the south aisle of Henry VII's chapel in the Abbey. It has been said that her grandson erected the fine monument, but it was commissioned in October 1578 by her executor and former servant Thomas Fowler. Her recumbent effigy, made of alabaster, wears a French cap and ruff with a red fur-lined cloak, over a dress of blue and gold. On either side of the tomb chest are weepers of her four sons and four daughters.

Robert Dudley, 1st Earl of Leicester had eight tapestries at Kenilworth Castle in 1588 which had been bought from "Lady Lennox". The subjects included Josias, Demophon and Achilles, and the History of Noah. At his death in 1624, Ludovic Stewart, 2nd Duke of Lennox had a bed in his lodgings at the gatehouse of Whitehall Palace that had belonged to Margaret Douglas, and she had "worked" or embroidered the curtains.

The Lennox Jewel was most likely made for Lady Lennox in the 1570s although the date and occasion of its commission is the subject of some controversy. In 1842, the jewel was bought by her descendant, Queen Victoria. The locket, considered "one of the most important early jewels in the Royal Collection", is on display in the Holyrood Palace.

Poetry 

Margaret Douglas is known for her poetry. Many of her works are written to her lover, Lord Thomas Howard, and are preserved in the Devonshire MS. Her close friends, Mary Shelton and the Duchess of Richmond, were the main contributors, as well as Henry Howard, Earl of Surrey and Thomas Wyatt.

Ancestry

References

External links

Margaret Douglas: The forgotten Tudor princess, BBC History Magazine, 18 November 2015 at 5:00 pm

Further reading

1515 births
1578 deaths
People from Northumberland
Burials at Westminster Abbey
Margaret Douglas
16th-century English women
16th-century English nobility
Margaret
Lennox
Daughters of Scottish earls
Household of Anne Boleyn
Household of Catherine Howard
Household of Catherine Parr